The 2014 FA Trophy Final was the 45th final of the Football Association's cup competition for levels 5–8 of the English football league system. The match was contested between Cambridge United of the Conference Premier and Gosport Borough of the Conference South. Neither team had been in the final before: this was only the third time that Gosport had reached the "proper" rounds of the Trophy, and were playing at Wembley Stadium for the first time in their history, while Cambridge were playing there for the first time since 2009, when they lost the Conference play-off final to Torquay United.

Cambridge United defeated Salisbury City, St Albans City, Luton Town, Eastleigh and Grimsby Town en route to the Final.

Gosport Borough defeated Dorchester Town, Concord Rangers, Nuneaton Town, Hungerford Town, North Ferriby United and Havant & Waterlooville en route to the Final.

Cambridge won the game 4–0.

Match

Details

References

FA Trophy Finals
Fa Trophy Final
Fa Trophy Final
Fa Trophy Final 2014
Fa Trophy Final 2014
Events at Wembley Stadium